Ryan's Well is a ghost town located in Itawamba County, Mississippi.

During the 1840s, a stage coach route from Aberdeen to Fulton passed through Ryan's Well. A post office operated under the name Ryans Well from 1852 to 1872.

References

Former populated places in Itawamba County, Mississippi
Former populated places in Mississippi